The 1922 Arizona gubernatorial election took place on November 7, 1922. George W. P. Hunt was Arizona's first governor, after retiring in 1919 he served as Ambassador to Siam during the tail end of the Woodrow Wilson administration. After being dismissed by President Warren G. Harding, Hunt returned to Arizona and decided to contest his old seat. Both Hunt and Campbell faced off in 1916, the closest gubernatorial in Arizona history. This election was the highest percentage of votes Hunt ever got in his 7 gubernatorial races.

Governor W. P. Hunt was sworn in for a fourth term as governor on January 1, 1923.

Democratic primary

Candidates
George W. P. Hunt, former governor, ambassador to Siam
Charles B. Ward, former Colorado attorney and state senator

Results

Republican primary

Candidates
Thomas E. Campbell, incumbent governor

Results

General election

References

Bibliography

1922
1922 United States gubernatorial elections
Gubernatorial
November 1922 events